Carlos María Jaramillo Mesa (born 16 January 1961) is a retired road racing cyclist from Colombia, who was a professional from 1985 to 1996. He competed for his native country at the 1984 Summer Olympics in the individual road race. Jaramillo is a younger brother of Sergio Jaramillo, and the older brother of Fabio Jaramillo.

Major results

1983
 in Pan American Games, Road, Caracas (VEN)
1984
52nd in Olympic Games, Road, Amateurs, Mission Viejo, Los Angeles (USA)
1985
1st in Stage 3 Criterium du Dauphiné Libéré (FRA)
1988
21st in General Classification Vuelta a España (ESP)
1989
13th in General Classification Vuelta a España (ESP)
1991
151st in General Classification Tour de France (FRA)
1992
1st in General Classification Vuelta a Antioquia (COL)
1st in Stage 2 Vuelta a Colombia, Popayán (COL)
4th in General Classification Vuelta a Colombia (COL)
68th in General Classification Tour de France (FRA)
1993
1st in General Classification Clásica 75 años Municipio de Bello Antioquia (COL)
1st in General Classification Clásica Nacional Marco Fidel Suárez (COL)
1st in Stage 7 Vuelta a Colombia, Manizales (COL)
1st in General Classification Vuelta a Colombia (COL)
1994
3rd in General Classification Vuelta a Colombia (COL)
1995
7th in General Classification Vuelta a Colombia (COL)

References

External links
 

1961 births
Living people
People from Itagüí
Colombian male cyclists
Vuelta a Colombia stage winners
Cyclists at the 1984 Summer Olympics
Olympic cyclists of Colombia
Cyclists at the 1983 Pan American Games
Pan American Games medalists in cycling
Pan American Games silver medalists for Colombia
Medalists at the 1983 Pan American Games
Sportspeople from Antioquia Department
20th-century Colombian people
21st-century Colombian people